The Arghistan District is a district in the northeastern part of Kandahar Province, Afghanistan. It borders Spin Boldak District to the south and west, Daman District to the west, Zabul Province to the north, Maruf District to the east and Pakistan to the east and south. The population is 30,500 (2006). The district's center is the village of Arghistan, in the physical center of the district in the Arghistan River valley.

In 2007, American soldiers guarded Provincial Reconstruction Teams in Arghistan. They left in late 2014 and the Afghan National Security Forces took over their responsibilities. In December 2020, work was completed on a dam that can store up to 126,000 cubic meters of water.

References

External links
AIMS District Map

Districts of Kandahar Province